Forest Ranch is an unincorporated community and census-designated place in Butte County, California. It includes Forest Ranch Charter School (K-8), its own post office, and a CDF and Volunteer fire stations. The community's ZIP code is 95942, and is shared with the community of Butte Meadows. The area code is 530. Forest Ranch's population was 1,184 at the 2010 census.

The eastern end of the community is about : about  higher. This is high enough that residents occasionally get "snowed in." Residents east of the center of the community report the snowfall is heavy enough to prevent driving about one to three days each year. This is only true of homes not located along State Route 32. Some residents commute to work in Chico, about fifteen driving miles west on SR32.

History
Forest Ranch post office was opened in 1878, closed in 1926, and re-established in 1932, and moved several times in 1938 to its present location.

Demographics

The 2010 United States Census reported that Forest Ranch had a population of 1,184. The racial makeup of Forest Ranch was 1,116 (94.3%) White, 8 (0.7%) African American, 6 (0.5%) Native American, 4 (0.3%) Asian, 1 (0.1%) Pacific Islander, 20 (1.7%) from other races, and 29 (2.4%) from two or more races. Hispanic or Latino of any race were 52 persons (4.4%).

The Census reported that 1,184 people (100% of the population) lived in households, 0 (0%) lived in non-institutionalized group quarters, and 0 (0%) were institutionalized.

There were 520 households, out of which 118 (22.7%) had children under the age of 18 living in them, 317 (61.0%) were opposite-sex married couples living together, 28 (5.4%) had a female householder with no husband present, 17 (3.3%) had a male householder with no wife present.  There were 30 (5.8%) unmarried opposite-sex partnerships, and 4 (0.8%) same-sex married couples or partnerships. 124 households (23.8%) were made up of individuals, and 30 (5.8%) had someone living alone who was 65 years of age or older. The average household size was 2.28.  There were 362 families (69.6% of all households); the average family size was 2.65.

The population was spread out, with 210 people (17.7%) under the age of 18, 55 people (4.6%) aged 18 to 24, 228 people (19.3%) aged 25 to 44, 496 people (41.9%) aged 45 to 64, and 195 people (16.5%) who were 65 years of age or older.  The median age was 50.0 years. For every 100 females, there were 99.3 males.  For every 100 females age 18 and over, there were 107.2 males.

The homeowner vacancy rate was 2.3%; the rental vacancy rate was 18.9%.  1,008 people (85.1% of the population) lived in owner-occupied housing units and 176 people (14.9%) lived in rental housing units.

References

 US Geological Survey, National Geographic Names Database
 Map: Cohasset, California, 7.5 minute quadrangle, 1995, US Geological Survey.

Census-designated places in Butte County, California
Populated places in the Sierra Nevada (United States)
Census-designated places in California